I Just Call On You was David Meece's second album. It is currently out-of-print.

Track listing 

All songs written by David Meece, except where noted.

Side 1
"It's Gonna Be So Lovely" (Meece, Chris Christian) - 2:46
"I Just Call On You" - 2:37
"With Tears In My Eyes" - 4:05 
"God's Love" - 3:01 
"The Man Who Saved The Fool" - 2:45

Side 2
"Follow Me (I'll Lead You Home)" - 3:10
"In The Morning" - 3:20 
"Cold October Rain" - 3:10 
"Love Your Brother" - 2:33 
"Do You Know What It's Like?" - 2:50

Personnel 
 David Meece – lead vocals, keyboards
 Shane Keister – keyboards
 Bobby Ogdin – keyboards
 Chris Christian – electric guitar, drums, backing vocals
 Steve Gibson  – electric guitar
 Steve Schaffer – bass
 Jerry Carrigan – drums
 Jimmy Isbell – drums
 Denis Solee – saxophone
 Shelly Kurland Strings – strings
 Archie Jordan – arrangements
 Brown Bannister – backing vocals
 Marty McCall – backing vocals
 Gwen Moore – backing vocals
 Gary Pigg – backing vocals

Production
 Producer – Chris Christian 
 Recorded and Remixed by Chris Christian and Brown Bannister at Gold Mine Studio (Nashville, TN).
 Mastered by Denny Purcell at Woodland Studios (Nashville, TN).
 Cover Artwork – Dennis Hill
 Back Cover Illustrations – Charles Wallis Inc. and Pat Pollei
 Photography – J.T. Morrow

David Meece albums
1977 albums